The Battle of Fadıl was a battle between Turkish National Forces and the French Third Republic during the Franco-Turkish War.

Background 
French interest in the region was sparked by the Sykes-Picot Agreement, signed amidst World War I.

Battle 
In October 1920, most of the Turkish forces in Çukurova were transferred to Konya due to civil disobedience in region. French intelligence leaked this information to French commanders in November 1920 and on 20 November 1920, French forces, who were equipped with modern weapons launched a military operation in Adana and Osmaniye. Even though the operation was successful at the start, with reinforcements from Konya arriving, National Forces managed to repel the French army.

Casualties 
Turkish claimed, there are 25 Turkish members of the National Forces died and 40 others were injured in the battle. French forces suffered heavy casualties, with some estimates reaching more than 500 KIA's.

References 

November 1920 events
Fadıl
1920 in the Ottoman Empire
1920 in France
Conflicts in 1920